The Egmont Ehapa Publishing Company (officially named Egmont Ehapa Verlag GmbH) was created in 1951 as a subdivision of the Egmont media group.

The name "Ehapa" was taken from the initials of its founder: Egmont Harald Petersen. Ehapa is known as a multi-faceted publisher of various kinds of digital and print media, including magazines, comics, books, movies, and even television shows. Egmont is commercially active in 21 different countries and, as of 2005, had approximately 3,600 employees and a yearly revenue of 1.2 billion Euros.

Some of the more popular German-language comics published by Egmont Ehapa Verlag GmbH include Asterix, Lucky Luke, Donald Duck, Mickey Mouse, Winnie the Pooh,  and SpongeBob SquarePants.

External links
Egmont Ehapa Verlag GmbH
Ehapa Shop

References 

Book publishing companies of Germany
Publishing companies of Germany
Publishing companies established in 1951
1951 establishments in West Germany
Disney comics publishers